Jamesport is a village in Riverhead in Suffolk County, New York. A census-designated place population estimate was around 1,710 at the 2010 census.

Jamesport consists of a downtown area and surrounding farms.

Hallock State Park Preserve (previously Jamesport State Park) is located north of Jamesport in the adjacent village of Northville.

Geography 

History 
Jamesport was first settled in the 1690s and was originally called "Aquebogue." It became "Lower Aquebogue" when another hamlet called "Upper Aquebogue" was established to the west. The Jamesport Meeting House, built in 1731, is the oldest operating church building in Suffolk County.

The name "Jamesport" refers to James Tuthill, a man who settled in the area south of Lower Aquebogue on the Peconic Bay with his family in 1833. Over time, Lower Aquebogue came to be called Jamesport, while the community  to the south, previously called Jamesport, came to be called South Jamesport (and is included in the present-day Jamesport CDP). Upper Aquebogue became Aquebogue.

James Tuthill's attempt to establish a commercial whaling and shipping wharf on the Peconic Bay in what is now South Jamesport was a failure. The depth of water at low tide was too shallow to accommodate ships. However, the Long Island Rail Road established service to Jamesport from New York City, and Jamesport became a popular resort and fishing community with several large bayfront hotels. These included the Miamogue Hotel and the Great Peconic Bay House, which operated until 1952. Jamesport was a center for the scallop and bunker (menhaden) fisheries.

From the 1830s to about 1950, Jamesport was the site of a camp meeting grove operated by the Methodist Episcopal Church and, after 1904, an Epworth League Fresh Air Camp.

During the 1960s, the Long Island Lighting Company (LILCO) designated land on the North Shore of Long Island for use as a possible second nuclear power station, in addition to its Shoreham plant already under construction. However, the Jamesport plan was scrapped when LILCO ran into opposition to Shoreham in the 1970s and 1980s.

Demographics 

As of the census of 2020, there are 1,609 people, 469 households, and 1,126 housing units in Jamesport. The population density is 216.0 per square mile. The ethnic makeup of the CDP is 88.6% White, 1.5% African American, 0.4% Asian, 0.06% Pacific Islander, 0.43% from other ethnicities, and 0.48% from two or more ethnicities. Hispanic or Latino of any ethnicity are 11% of the population.

There are 469 households, out of which 56.7% are married couples living together, 29.4% have a female householder with no spouse present, and 3.2% have a male householder with no spouse present.

10.2% of the population are minors. 9.9% of the population is classified as living below the poverty line.

Schools 
 Mattituck-Cutchogue Union Free School District (small eastern portion of CDP of Jamesport)
 Riverhead Central School District (majority of CDP of Jamesport)

References

External links 

 Jamesport History
 Jamesport Meeting House Preservation Trust

Riverhead (town), New York
Census-designated places in New York (state)
Hamlets in New York (state)
Census-designated places in Suffolk County, New York
Hamlets in Suffolk County, New York
Populated coastal places in New York (state)